Mustapha Isah Ubandoma (born 23 July 2004) is a Nigerian professional footballer who plays as a left winger for the U-10 squad of Danish Superliga side Randers FC.

Club career

Randers FC
Following a successful trial, Isah joined Randers FC from HB Academy in Abuja in July 2022. The 18-year old winger signed a three-year deal with Randers. 

In his first six months in Randers, Isah mainly played for the U19s, while making the bench for a few Danish Superliga games during the months. He got his official debut for the club in the Danish Cup against Vendsyssel FF on 20 October 2022, playing the last 12 minutes off the bench. In February 2023, Isah went with the first team squad on training camp in Turkey. Later on same month, on 26 February, Isah got his Danish Superliga debut against Lyngby Boldklub.

References

External links
 

2004 births
Living people
Nigerian footballers
Nigerian expatriate footballers
Association football wingers
Randers FC players
Danish Superliga players
Nigerian expatriate sportspeople in Denmark
Expatriate men's footballers in Denmark